Khamamatyurt (Xamamatyurt) is a rural locality (a selo) in Babayurtovsky District, Republic of Dagestan, Russia. The population was 4,682 as of 2010. There are 39 streets.

Geography 
Khamamatyurt is located on the right bank of the Terek River, 24 km west of Babayurt (the district's administrative centre) by road. Kalininaul is the nearest rural locality.

References 

Rural localities in Babayurtovsky District